Pringle is an unincorporated community in Washington County, in the U.S. state of Georgia.

History
A post office called Pringle was established in 1883, and remained in operation until 1903. The community was named after C.R. Pringle, a local resident.

References

Unincorporated communities in Washington County, Georgia
Unincorporated communities in Georgia (U.S. state)